Andrea DeShong (born March 16, 1962) is a former United States female boxer who is best remembered for defeating Christy Martin in Martin's fourth professional bout.

Professional career 

DeShong made her professional debut on March 11, 1989, when she beat Angel Horton  by a first round knockout in Wheeling, West Virginia. After one more win, she faced the experienced Jamie Whitcomb, and also won this bout by a first-round knockout.

First fights with Martin 

After winning two more fights, one by a second-round knockout, she and Martin met on November 4, at Bristol, Tennessee. DeShong inflicted Martin's first career defeat, winning by a five-round decision. Right after defeating Martin, she had a second victory against Whitcomb, who lasted five full rounds this time, before losing a unanimous decision to DeShong.

On April 21, 1990, she and Martin fought for the second time, and Martin avenged her defeat, while at the same time handing DeShong her own first loss as a professional, by a five-round decision, also at Bristol.

Rematch 

It remains difficult for women boxers to find matches, and it was more difficult prior to the mid-'90s. DeShong ended up having a six-year layoff after the rematch with Martin. When she returned to boxing, she was somewhat known to fans, as Martin had become the WBC women's World Welterweight Champion, and DeShong remained the only boxer to defeat her as a professional. It helped DeShong regain prominence that Martin had become a symbol of women's boxing, having appeared in the cover of Sports Illustrated magazine and becoming a popular fighter by appearing on Showtime Network boxing undercards as well as pay-per-view boxing shows.

Return 

DeShong returned April 27, 1996, losing a four-round decision to Christine Butts. After two knockout wins against Jackie Rogers and one more win, she faced veteran Kathy Collins, losing by a six-round unanimous decision at New York, New York.

After another win, she faced Isra Girgrah, on November 10, at Washington, D.C. The two fought to a six-round draw (tie).

After two more wins, she received her first world title try, on March 2, 1997, being knocked out by Jane Couch in seven rounds at New Orleans, Louisiana, for the WIBF's World Jr. Welterweight title.

Despite that setback, her next fight was a major event. As part of the undercard of the rematch between Evander Holyfield and Mike Tyson ("The Bite Fight"), which also featured former world champions Julio César Chávez and Miguel Ángel González, she and Martin met for a third time. The fight was preceded by much fan hype, and both boxers were involved in "trash talking" on the days leading to the match. Martin defeated DeShong by a seventh-round knockout on June 28.

DeShong lost to Lucia Rijker in her next fight, September 13, by a knockout in round three.

Despite losing three fights in a row, she found herself challenging Kathy Collins for the world title in her next fight. DeShong failed for the second time to win the world title, also losing for the fourth time in a row, when Collins handed her a ten-round unanimous decision loss on January 10, 1998, for the IWBF World Jr. Welterweight title.

After two more losses in a row, to Sumya Anani and Mitzi Jeter, she retired from boxing.

Some fans and critics have observed that, after she gave up boxing for the first time, she should not have returned. When she did return, in 1996, she was 34 years old, an age when most boxers and athletes in general are considered to be "past their prime".

Andrea DeShong had 13 wins, 9 losses and 1 draw in 24 bouts, with 8 knockout wins.

Professional boxing record

References

External links
 Andrea DeShong at Women's Boxing Archive Network
 Andrea DeShong at BoxRec

1962 births
Living people
American women boxers
Boxers from Ohio
People from Mingo Junction, Ohio
Lightweight boxers
21st-century American women